Christiaan "Chris" Dolman (born 17 February 1945) is a Dutch retired judoka, sambo player and wrestler. He won a silver medal at the European championship in judo and a gold at the world championship in sambo, counting as the first non-Russian sambo world champion, and has over 40 national and 10 international championships. He is known for his career in Fighting Network Rings and for his role training several Dutch Mixed Martial Artists and Kickboxers, among them Bas Rutten, Alistair and Valentijn Overeem, Gilbert Yvel and Gegard Mousasi.

Career
Dolman started training judo under Jon Bluming at the Tung-Yen dojo while in college. He became a professional competitor shortly after. In 1970, he extended his competition to sambo by taking part in an international tournament in Moscow. Reportedly, Dolman had no sambo experience, having watched his first practice session of the art two days before the event, and still he dominated the tournament with just his judo and wrestling training.

His first visit to the Japanese rings was in 1976, backing Willem Ruska during his professional wrestling match against Antonio Inoki in New Japan Pro-Wrestling. Inspired by this kind of competition, he celebrated a tournament of modern pankration in Holland in 1981. In 1984, Dolman had his own professional wrestling debut in Universal Wrestling Federation, wrestling Kazuo Yamazaki in a different style fight which Dolman won by armbar.

After UWF's demise, Dolman was contacted by Akira Maeda for his Fighting Network Rings promotion. Leading a stable of Dutch apprentices, which included Dick Vrij, Gilbert Yvel, Valentijn Overeem and other names, Dolman became Maeda's first rival in Rings. He would win the inaugural Rings Mega Battle Tournament in 1993 defeating Maeda in the finals, although the Japanese got revenge on him eliminating him from the 1993 edition. After being eliminated by Yoshihisa Yamamoto the next year, Dolman would stop competing in the tournament, dedicating himself fully to his stablemaster role. His final in-ring match was in 1995, defeating his underling Joop Kasteel.

According to Jon Bluming, Dolman challenged the Gracie family several times during his stint in Rings, but they never answered his letters.

He currently teaches at the Chakuriki/Pancration Gym along with Thom Harinck and leads the RINGS Holland promotion.

Championships and accomplishments

Greco-Roman/Freestyle Wrestling
 1966 Benelux Championship
 1967 Benelux Championship
 1968 Benelux Championship
 1969 Benelux Championship

Judo
 1974 European Judo Championship 93 kg class silver medalist
 1966 European Youth Judo Championship
 1965 Netherlands Youth Judo Championship
 Eight times Netherlands Judo Championship

Professional Wrestling
 Fighting Network Rings
 Mega Battle Tournament (1992)

Sambo
 1969 World Sambo Championship gold medalist
 1985 World Sambo Championship gold medalist
 World Games 1985 Sambo Championship 100 kg class gold medalist
 National A.A.U. Sambo Championship (1978)

References

External links
 

1945 births
Living people
Dutch male judoka
Dutch male karateka
Dutch male kickboxers
Dutch sambo practitioners
Kyokushin kaikan practitioners
Mixed martial arts referees
Mixed martial arts trainers
Sportspeople from Amsterdam
World Games gold medalists
Competitors at the 1985 World Games